Bogd Khan Uul Biosphere Reserve is a nature reserve situated to the south of Ulaanbaatar in Mongolia. It includes Bogd Khan Mountain, and was designated as a UNESCO Biosphere Reserve in 1996. It claims to be the oldest National Park in the world.

Description

It consists of a core area of about  surrounded by a buffer zone and certain transition areas. The northern slopes of Bogd Khan Mountain are covered with dense coniferous forests while the southern side is bare rock.

History
Environmental protection on Bogd Khan Mountain dates back at least to the thirteenth century when the Tooril Khan ruler of the Keraites, forbade logging and hunting there, claiming that Bogd Khan was a holy mountain. Since then, the mountain has been venerated, and local people neither hunted on the mountain nor harvested the timber. In 1778 the Mongolian governor of what is now Ulan-Bator, petitioned the Qianlong Emperor requesting approval to hold twice yearly ceremonies dedicated to Mount Bogd Khan Uul. Permission was granted eight days later for ceremonies to be held twice annually. In 1783, the local government of the Qing dynasty declared the Bogd Khan a protected site, to be preserved for its beauty, making it the oldest national park in the world.

Bogd Khan Uul was declared a biosphere reserve by UNESCO in 1996. A biosphere reserve aims to "develop and implement sustainable development approaches" and encourage "ecological and cultural diversity", by integrating the needs of local communities with the preservation of the environment. The core area is strictly protected, the buffer zone is used for activities that are compatible with good ecological practices and the transition zone allows ecologically sustainable activities to take place.

Flora and fauna
The reserve has a number of habitat types including grassland, taiga vegetation, Alpine tundra and bare rock. In some areas there are mixed forest with larch (Larix sibirica), birch (Betula spp.), "Pinus sibirica" ("cedar" common Russian name) (Pinus spp.), pine (Pinus spp.) and poplar (Populus spp.).

Some of the most threatened mammals in the reserve are the musk deer (Moschus moschiferus), the roe deer (Capreolus capreolus), the sable (Martes zibellina) and the Arctic hare (Lepus timidus).

References

Nature reserves in Mongolia